Eria Paul Luzinda Kizito  was an Anglican bishop who served in Uganda: he was the third  Bishop of Mukono, serving from 2002 to 2010.

References

20th-century Anglican bishops in Uganda
Anglican bishops of Mukono